Mantralayam is a pilgrim village in Kurnool district in Andhra Pradesh, India, on the banks of the Tungabhadra River on the border with neighbouring Karnataka state. It is known for the brundavana of Raghavendra Swami, a saint who lived in 17th century and who entered into samadhi alive in front of his disciples. Thousands of people visit the Raghavendra Matha and temples on the banks of river.

References

External links 

Official Website of SRS Matha, Mantralayam

Cities and towns in Kurnool district